Father Brown is a 1954 British mystery comedy film directed by Robert Hamer and starring Alec Guinness as the title character with Joan Greenwood, Peter Finch and Cecil Parker. Like the American film Father Brown, Detective (1934), it is based loosely on The Blue Cross (1910), the first Father Brown short story by G. K. Chesterton. It was shot at the Riverside Studios in London. The film's sets were designed by the art director John Hawkesworth. It was distributed by Columbia Pictures in both Britain and the United States where it was released as The Detective. It was screened at the 1954 Venice Film Festival.

Plot
The police raid a premises at night and find a priest at an open safe: he explains he is replacing the money for a parishioner. He is arrested and put in the cells but released when the bishop confirms who he is. Outside he meets the erring parishioner Bert (Sid James) and convinces him to be a chauffeur to Lady Warren rather than drive get-away cars.

He is chosen to go to Rome carrying a 1,200-year-old priceless crucifix. He is aware that his rival, the arch criminal Flambeau, may try to steal the cross.

He sails to France then catches a train. The first stop is Paris. He is accompanied by a priest he met on the ship. As they sit in a cafe they are aware that two policemen are watching. They wait until there are only two seats left on an excursion bus then grab it, leaving the police stranded. The two police get a lift in the back of a police van with a group of prostitutes.

The excursion goes to the catacombs. There they separate from the group. Father Brown has worked out that the priest is Flambeau as he ordered a ham sandwich (on a Friday). Nevertheless Flambeau overpowers him and steals the cross, leaving Brown tied against a pile of bones. Flambeau changes disguise and gets past the two police who wait at the entrance.

Father Brown convinces his friend, Lady Warren, to auction an important gold chess set to lure Flambeau into stealing it. They expect him to appear in disguise at the auction. He does, but not as a bidder: Flambeau is the porter who carries the set out of the room after bidding concludes. But Flambeau returns the set to Lady Warren to prove a point. When the police arrive at the door Flambeau and Brown remove all the milk from the back of a milk van to make it look as if they needed the space. This diversion makes the police follow the van and Brown and Flambeau escape.

Brown starts researching Flambeau in the library (breaking his glasses in this task) and finds a link to Fleurency in the Burgundy region of France. He then goes there. At a wine festival he finds Flambeau but Flambeau slips away. The next day he finds the old chateau and asks for "the duke". He is told he is not home. He slips into the inner courtyard disguised as an old woman on a cart of grapes.

On entering the chateau he finds signs of habitation but the chateau is ruinous. He discovers a secret door in the back of the big kitchen fireplace and Flambeau asks him to enter. Inside he has a priceless art collection. He gives Brown the stolen cross. The police arrive and Flambeau flees through the window. His art collection is retrieved by the police and displayed in the Louvre.

Back in England Father Brown gives a sermon on the prodigal son. Flambeau enters and sits next to Lady Warren.

Cast

Adaptation
It is based on G. K. Chesterton's Father Brown character and was directed by Robert Hamer. The screenplay adaptation is based loosely on the Father Brown story, "The Blue Cross". Although credited to Thelma Schnee and Hamer, it was actually co-written by Schnee and blacklisted screenwriter Maurice Rapf.

Critical reception
Variety said the film was, "distinguished mainly by the excellent casting of Alec Guinness in the title role". The New York Times found it "a leisurely, good-humored film." Leonard Maltin called it "another British gem, superbly cast".

Box Office
According to Kinematograph Weekly the film was a "money maker" at the British box office in 1954.

Awards and nominations
Venice Film Festival
1954: Nominated, "Golden Lion Award" - Robert Hamer

References

External links
 
 
 

1954 films
1950s comedy mystery films
Adaptations of works by G. K. Chesterton
British comedy mystery films
British black-and-white films
Films directed by Robert Hamer
Films shot at Riverside Studios
Films set in Paris
Films about Catholic priests
Films scored by Georges Auric
1954 comedy films
1950s English-language films
1950s British films
Films with screenplays by Maurice Rapf